J. Frederic Voros Jr. is an American jurist, hymnist, and author. He was a judge on the Utah Court of Appeals from 2009 to 2017.

Education
Voros received a bachelor's degree in English from Brigham Young University (BYU) in 1975. He later obtained a Juris Doctor from BYU J. Reuben Clark Law School in 1978.

Early legal career
Voros served as general counsel to Ricks College in Rexburg, Idaho from 1978 to 1981, leaving that position to clerk for Dallin H. Oaks of the Utah Supreme Court. He practiced commercial litigation with the Salt Lake City law firm of Prince, Yeates & Geldzahler, and later at the firm of Poole & Associates. Voros joined the Criminal Appeals Division of the Utah Attorney General's Office in 1991 and worked as Division Chief of the Criminal Appeals Division from 1999 until he was appointed to the bench in 2009. During his time in the Attorney General's Office, Voros taught appellate advocacy at the S.J. Quinney College of Law for ten years, receiving the Peter W. Billings Excellence in Teaching Award in 2005. He chaired the Supreme Court Advisory Committee on the Rules of Professional Responsibility and later served on the Supreme Court Advisory Committee on the Rules of Appellate Procedure for 24 years.

Judicial career
Voros was appointed to the Utah Court of Appeals by Governor Gary Herbert in December 2009. His appointment came after the retirement of Judge Judith Billings, who had been on the court since its creation in 1987. Of his appointment, Herbert stated, "Fred brings a great deal of knowledge and experience to the Utah Court of Appeals. He has significant experience in all areas of the law, especially at the appellate level, and will be a good complement to the six sitting judges." Along with Utah Court of Appeals Judge Stephen L. Roth, Voros was named the 2017 Judge of the Year by the Utah State Bar. Voros retired from the bench on August 1, 2017.

Selected opinions
Fire Insurance Exchange v. Oltmanns, 2012 UT App 230, 285 P.3d 802

Judge Voros wrote a concurring opinion discussing the propriety of citing Wikipedia as a source of authority in court opinions. The case dealt with the interpretation of the words "jet ski" in an insurance contract. Looking to Wikipedia and several dictionaries, the majority opinion concluded that the term "jet ski" was ambiguous and could refer either to all personal watercraft or only those of the stand-up variety. Judge Voros discussed the pitfalls and promise of using Wikipedia in such situations. Ultimately, he endorsed the use of Wikipedia to determine the common usage of words, with the caveat that the source should be viewed critically to guard against manipulation of Wikipedia entries for purposes of litigation.

Peterson v. Jackson, 2011 UT App 113, 253 P.3d 1096

Jack W. Peterson, Alan D. Allred and D. Scott Jackson were the sole shareholders of the certified public accounting firm Peterson Allred Jackson. In 2006, conflicts developed among the partners with Peterson alleging that Allred and Jackson attempted to "freeze out, terminate, and destroy [Peterson's] equity, employment, management, and investment expectation." Peterson filed for dissolution after which Jackson and Allred elected to purchase Peterson's shares in lieu of dissolution.  Peterson, who co-founded the firm with Allred in 1984, owned 36.37% of the company. The parties could not reach an agreement on a fair value of the shares and took the case to trial. Experts for both parties each determined values for Peterson's shares with Peterson's expert valuing them at $505,625 and the expert of the remaining shareholders valuing them at $224,639. The court determined a "fair value" of $459,000. Both sides appealed. Judges McHugh, Voros and Roth affirmed the court's decision.

Hymn Writing 
Voros founded the Western Hymn Writers Workshop in 2012 as a forum for hymnists in the Salt Lake City area to "sing, share, and workshop new hymns in the Christian and Mormon traditions." Many of Voros's hymns focus on themes of social justice and inclusion.

Voros and Catherine A. Tibbitts won the best anthem award in the 2014 church music submission competition of the Church of Jesus Christ of Latter-day Saints for the hymn, "This Day Is a Good Day, Lord." Voros wrote the text and music, and Tibbitts arranged the anthem. Voros and Tibbitts also won an award of merit in the anthem division of the 2017 church music submission competition for the hymn "What God Calls Us To." Voros wrote the text and Tibbitts wrote the music.

Other Writings
Voros wrote a children's book about the Salt Lake Temple of the Church of Jesus Christ of Latter-day Saints entitled, The Stones of the Temple, along with illustrator Kathleen B. Peterson. It was published in 1993 by Deseret Book Company.

External links
Articles written by Voros:
 To Persuade a Judge, Think Like a Judge
 Freedom of Speech in the Household of Faith

References

Living people
Utah state court judges
Year of birth missing (living people)
Brigham Young University alumni
J. Reuben Clark Law School alumni
Writers from Utah